The opening ceremony of the 1998 Winter Olympics took place at Nagano Olympic Stadium, Nagano, Japan, on 7 February 1998. It began at 11:00 JST and finished at approximately 14:00 JST. As mandated by the Olympic Charter, the proceedings combined the formal and ceremonial opening of this international sporting event, including welcoming speeches, hoisting of the flags and the parade of athletes, with an artistic spectacle to showcase the host nation's culture and history. The Games were officially opened by Emperor of Japan Akihito.

Alan Tomlinson, Professor in Leisure Studies at the University of Brighton, argues that the main theme of this opening ceremony is Peace and Harmony. While elements of Nagano's religious and sporting culture are shown throughout the ceremony, it is shown alongside examples of world peace at the end of the 20th century.

Officials and Guests
 International Olympic Committee - IOC President Juan Antonio Samaranch and María Teresa Salisachs Rowe, and Members of the International Olympic Committee
  United Nations - Secretary General Kofi Annan
  Japan - NAOC President Eishiro Saito, Emperor Akihito, Empress Michiko
  Luxembourg - Grand Duke Jean
  Monaco - Sovereign Prince Rainier III
  Norway - Crown Prince Haakon (representing the King of Norway)
  United States - Founder of International Campaign to Ban Landmines and American political activist - Jody Williams
  South Korea - Prime Minister Kim Jong-pil
  Belarus - President Aleksander Lukashenko

Proceedings

Bell to Symbolize Purification

At exactly 11am JST, a bell at Zenkō-ji temple was rung, by a man who was a teenager during World War II, and was in training to be a kamikaze pilot when the war ended. The bell that was rung was cast in 1667, and reverberates as a symbol of Nagano. It was rung to confer blessing on the opening ceremony.

Raising of Onbashira to Consecrate Sacred Ground
Onbashira — or "sacred pillars" in the Japanese — are large wooden fir posts which stand at the corners of local shrines in Nagano Prefecture. They are brought down from the surrounding mountains to purify the earth. At this ceremony, hundreds of people performed the Satobiki ceremony, where four 12 meter high onbashira are erected at the two entrances of the stadium. The logs are raised with ropes by hand, and while they are being raised, a ceremonial group of log bearers ride the logs and sing and perform other feats, while numerous men and women sustain a consistent chant. Barry Davies — the commentator for the BBC broadcast showing stated that the chants were "plaintive" being a "prelude to much hard work." Finally, each post unfurled a yellow steamer which were to call the gods that lived in the trees.

Dohyo-iri Ceremony
33 Sumo Wrestlers across Japan enter the stadium to perform the Dohyō-iri ring purification ceremony, which while practiced in the Edo Period, it is one that can be traceable back to an 8th century text. Then Yokozuna Akebono Tarō, eight-time Sumo Grand Champion, and 38 other wrestlers also enter the stadium, totaling the 72 wrestlers. 

The Emperor of Japan Akihito, and his wife, Empress Michiko arrive with IOC President Juan Antonio Samaranch and other dignitaries. 

Then Akebono performed the Yokozuna dohyo-iri ring purification ceremony, the symbolic calling of the attention of the gods and expelling the evil spirits from the competition venue. It is more intricate than the normal dohyo-iri ceremony.

Children of Nagano Welcome the Athletes
Giant straw Dōsojin, which appear in Shinto folklore in Ōoka village arrive in the stadium. 150 primary school aged children, local participants of the "One School, One Country" initiative, arrive dressed as Yukinko, traditional straw winter coats and hats. After some dancing, the children take off their straw coats, showing knitted sweaters of country flags representing the 72 nations competing in these Winter Games. Each child will march with their country during the Parade of Nations, and will appear also during the lighting of the Olympic Flame. 

Japanese artist Ryoko Moriyama and primary school children perform "Ashita Koso Kodomotachi ga...", based upon When Children Rule the World from the 1996 Andrew Lloyd Webber musical Whistle Down the Wind. It is performed in both Japanese and English.

Parade of Nations

2,302 athletes from 72 countries and regions participated in the competition, including 814 female athletes and 1488 male athletes. Both the number of participating delegations and the number of athletes participating in the competition were the most ever at the time. At this Olympics, Uruguay, Azerbaijan and Macedonia had their largest grouping in the history of the Winter Olympics.

Opening Addresses
NAOC President Eishiro Saito delivered a speech in Japanese, welcoming everyone. IOC President Juan Antonio Samaranch delivered a speech in English, calling for athletes to "observe the Olympic truce." His Imperial Majesty the Emperor of Japan Akihito declared the games open in Japanese.

Olympic Flag and Anthems
After a fanfare, the Olympic Flag was carried around the stadium by eight former Japanese Olympians: Chiharu Igaya, Yukio Kasaya, Akitsugu Konno, Yoshihiro Kitazawa, Hatsue Nagakubo-Takamizawa, Yuko Otaka, Seiko Hashimoto, and Hiromi Yamamoto. During the raising of the Olympic flag, the Olympic Hymn was sung in Japanese by the Nagano Children's Choir.

The Japanese National Anthem, Kimigayo, was played by Gagaku musicians.

 Nagano City Children's Choir – Olympic Hymn
 Gagaku musicians - National Anthem of Japan

Torch relay and the lighting of the Olympic cauldron

At the end of a 49-day torch relay across Japan, the Olympic flame is carried into the stadium by Chris Moon, an Landmine Survivors Network member and an advocate for banning anti-personnel landmines. He is accompanied by the local Nagano children featured earlier wearing their flag sweaters. There is also a reprise of the theme song, When Children Rule the World. Moon hands over the Olympic torch to Masako Chiba, bronze medalist for the Women's 10,000 metres at the 1997 World Championships in Athletics in Athens, but only after presenting the torch and Olympic Flame to the Imperial Couple in the royal box, with the Emperor and Empress applauding him. 
Chiba passes the torch to Takanori Kono, Masashi Abe, and Reiichi Mikata for the Nordic Combine team, then Hiromi Suzuki, winner of the Women's marathon who runs upstairs while surrounded by local Nagano children. The last torchbearer is Midori Ito, Olympic silver medalist of the Ladies' singles at the Figure skating at the 1992 Winter Olympics in Albertville, and champion of the 1989 World Figure Skating Championships, who lights the cauldron, appearing to be dressed as a representation of the sun goddess Amaterasu of Japanese mythology and their Shinto beliefs. The music played during this sequence is Un bel dì, vedremo aria from the opera Giacomo Puccini's "Madama Butterfly".

Olympic Oaths and Dove Balloons
Japanese men's Nordic combined skier Kenji Ogiwara took the oath on behalf of all 1998 Olympic athletes in Japanese, while the officials' oath was taken by figure skating referee Junko Hiramatsu in Japanese.

1,998 balloons in the shape of doves were released from the stage of the stadium.

The Grand Chorus
The finale of the opening ceremony featured a choral performance of the 4th movement of Ludwig van Beethoven's Symphony No. 9 ("Ode to Joy"), conducted by Ozawa Seiji, joined by choruses from the five satellite locations in Beijing, Berlin, Cape Town, New York City, and Sydney; The New York Times described the sequence as having been "the first time that images and sounds from around the globe were united in a simultaneous live performance."

Performers
Nagano Prefectural Culture Hall: Ozawa Seiji, Tokyo Opera Singers, Nagano Winter Orchestra. Sopranos: Izabela Labuda, Claudia Waite, Altos: Zheng Cao, Ruth Peel, Tenors: Anthony Dean Griffey, Gwyn Hughes Jones, Baritones: Denis Sedov, Kevin Short.

Ernst Senff Choir at the Brandenburg Gate in Berlin, Germany
 Sydney Philharmonia Choirs at the Sydney Opera House, Sydney, Australia
 Boston Symphony Tanglewood Festival Chorus at the United Nations General Assembly Hall in New York City, United States
 China National Symphony Orchestra Chorus at the Shenwu Gate (Gate of Divine Prowess) of the Forbidden City in Beijing, China
 Harmony Singers, Princess Square Singers, and the Cape Town Philharmonia Choir in False Bay Cape Point, near Cape Town, South Africa

Following the performance of Ode to Joy, a flyover was done by the Japan Air Self-Defense Force performance squadron Blue Impulse, leaving smoke trails in the colors of the Olympic Rings behind them as they flew over the Olympic Stadium.

Legacy
Alan Tomlinson, argues that Peace and Harmony is this opening ceremony's theme. While elements of Nagano's culture are shown throughout the ceremony, the main theme shown is how the world is more unified and harmonious at the last Winter Olympics of the 20th century. This is best seen in the massed choir that marked the beginning and the end of this ceremony, with satellite choirs at key symbolic locations of peace. It is also seen through at the flame's entrance by emphasizing the work of the International Campaign to Ban Landmines. 

Since 2000, the theme of universalism bringing peace in Olympic opening ceremonies have been dropped for more nationalistic displays, as seen in the 2002 Winter Olympics opening ceremony.

References

Bibliography

External links

opening ceremony
Ceremonies in Japan
Olympics opening ceremonies